The Garhwal Himalayas are mountain ranges located in the Indian state of Uttarakhand.

Geology 
This range is also a part of Himalaya Sivalik Hills, the outer most hills of the Himalaya located in Himachal Pradesh and Uttarakhand.

Major peaks of Garhwal Himalayas
 Nanda Devi 
Kamet 
Sunanda Devi 
Abi Gamin 
Mana peak
Mukut parbat

Demographics 
The cities which are included in these ranges are Pauri, Tehri, Uttarkashi, Rudraprayag, Chamoli, and Chota Char Dham pilgrimage namely Gangotri, Yamunotri, Badrinath and Kedarnath. Some of the beautiful sites of the location are the hill stations of Mussoorie, Dhanaulti, Auli, Chakrata, Chopta, UNESCO World Heritage Site, Nanda Devi and Valley of Flowers National Parks is also located in Garhwal Himalaya.

See also
 Garhwal division
 List of mountain peaks of Uttarakhand
 Himalayas

References

Mountain ranges of the Himalayas
Mountain ranges of India